The Pioneer is an English-language daily newspaper in India.
It is published from multiple locations in India, including Delhi. It is the second oldest English-language newspaper in India still in circulation after The Times of India. In 2010, The Pioneer launched its Hindi version in Lucknow.

History 
 

The Pioneer was founded in Allahabad in 1865, by George Allen, an Englishman who had  great success in the tea business in north-east India in the previous decade.  It was brought out three times a week from 1865 to 1869 and daily thereafter. In 1866, a supplement, the Pioneer Mail, consisting of "48 quarto-size pages," mostly of  advertisements, was added to the publication.  In 1872, Alfred Sinnett became the editor of the newspaper.  Although he was later to be known for his interest in theosophy, he oversaw the transformation of the newspaper to one of exercising great influence in British India.  In 1874, the weekly Pioneer Mail became the Pioneer Mail and India Weekly News and began to also feature short stories and travel writings. Author Rudyard Kipling (1865-1936), in his early 20s, worked at the newspaper office in Allahabad as an assistant editor from November 1887 to March 1889.
In July 1933, The Pioneer was sold to a syndicate and moved from Allahabad to Lucknow, Uttar Pradesh, at which time the Pioneer Mail and India Weekly News ceased publication.

The newspaper remained a primarily Lucknow-based paper until 1990, when it was purchased by the Thapar Group, under L. M. Thapar, who made it a national newspaper, published from Delhi, Lucknow, Bhubaneswar, Kochi, Bhopal, Chandigarh, Dehradun and Ranchi. Thapar sold the paper to its editor Chandan Mitra in 1998. At that time it had 484 employees. Mitra announced that he intended to seek other investors in due course rather than to remain the owner.
On 17 October 2010, The Pioneer launched its Hindi version of the newspaper from Lucknow  and in May 2012, the paper inaugurated its Raipur bureau, beginning operations of its Chhattisgarh edition.

 Chandan Mitra was the Editor-in-Chief of The Pioneer. He resigned as printer and publisher in June 2021, and died in September 2021.

Editions 

 Delhi
 Lucknow
 Bhopal
Bhubaneshwar
 Chandigarh
 Raipur
 Dehradun
 Ranchi
 Telangana

Lucknow edition includes four other editions Varanasi, Kanpur, Allahabad and Lucknow itself.

Columnists 

 Chandan Mitra
 Kanchan Gupta
 Balbir Punj
 K G Suresh
 KPS Gill

Cartoonists  
 Sudhir Dar (former)
 Shekhar Gurera
 Irfan Hussain (former)

References

1865 establishments in British India
Publications established in 1865
English-language newspapers published in India
Daily newspapers published in India